Gretchen Merrill (November 2, 1925 – April 22, 1965) was an American figure skater. Gretchen was a six-time (1943–1948) U.S. national champion and thrice placed second in 1941, 1942 and 1949. She was the 1947 European silver medalist and World bronze medalist, winning those medals in the first World and Europeans Championships to be held since 1939. She was the second and last American woman to win a medal at the European Championships; following 1948, the competition was restricted to skaters representing European countries. Merrill placed 8th at the 1948 Winter Olympics.

She was married to William O. Gay and died in 1965. She was inducted into the United States Figure Skating Hall of Fame in 2000.

Results

References

 Skatabase: 1940s Europeans
 Skatabase: 1940s Worlds
 Skatabase: 1940s Olympics

Navigation

1965 deaths
American female single skaters
Olympic figure skaters of the United States
Figure skaters at the 1948 Winter Olympics
1925 births
World Figure Skating Championships medalists
European Figure Skating Championships medalists
20th-century American women
20th-century American people